Last Summer is a 1969 teen drama film directed by Frank Perry and written by his then-wife Eleanor Perry, based on the 1968 novel of the same name by Evan Hunter. It stars Barbara Hershey, Richard Thomas, Bruce Davison, and Catherine Burns. The film follows the exploits of four teenagers during a summer vacation on Fire Island, New York.

Released in the United States on June 19, 1969, Last Summer received generally positive reviews, with Burns garnering an Academy Award nomination for Best Supporting Actress.

Plot
Dan and Peter, two youths vacationing on Fire Island, befriend a young woman named Sandy, who has found an injured seagull on a beach. While nursing the seagull back to health, the three friends spend time experimenting with alcohol, marijuana, and their own sexuality. The trio make the acquaintance of a slightly younger teenager, Rhoda, a shy, plump girl who confides in the others that her mother died in a drowning accident. One day, the boys find that Sandy has killed the seagull after it bit her. The three older friends pull a prank by arranging a dinner date with an older man, Anibal, through a computer dating service, getting him drunk, and then abandoning him to a group of local bullies, despite Rhoda's protests. Tension builds between Rhoda and the three older teens, and in the final sequence Dan, Peter, and Sandy pin down Rhoda near the beach as Dan rapes her. After the attack, the trio walk away, leaving Rhoda behind near a sand dune.

Cast
Richard Thomas as Peter
Bruce Davison as Dan
Barbara Hershey as Sandy
Catherine Burns as Rhoda
Ernesto Gonzalez as Anibal

Production notes

 Eleanor Perry's screenplay was based on the novel by Evan Hunter, published in hardcover by Doubleday (1968) and paperback by Signet (1969).
 The character of Dan was originally called David in the book but was changed for the film.
 The accidental breaking of a seagull's neck during filming affected Barbara Hershey sufficiently for her to change her surname to Seagull for a couple of years.
 Sondra Locke was offered the role of Sandy, but her agent turned it down without telling her about it.
 Ralph Waite played father to Richard Thomas in this movie, then went on to play his father again in The Waltons.
 The film takes place almost entirely on Fire Island, a long sandbar off Long Island with the Atlantic Ocean on one side, the Great South Bay on the other, and upper-class summer homes built on its beaches and dunes.
 Evan Hunter, author of the source novel, wrote a sequel novel, which he titled Come Winter, in 1973. Hunter was working on the screenplay of Come Winter; however, it was never filmed.
 Last Summer was one of a handful of high-profile X-rated movies that were released in 1969 along with the Oscar-winning best picture Midnight Cowboy and Haskell Wexler's docudrama Medium Cool.
 First given an X rating when it was first submitted to the MPAA due to the scene that depicted Rhoda's rape, it was then edited down to an MPAA R-rating shortly after its initial theatrical release, with the cut version still containing nudity and strong language. When the film is transmitted occasionally on television, a further-censored PG-rated version is presented which cuts out all nudity and heavily edits the scene of Rhoda's rape. The R-rated version is the one seen in the VHS videotape release. The film is not available on DVD, nor is the original X-rated version.
 All original 35mm prints of the film were lost for years. In 2001, a 16mm print was located at the National Film and Sound Archive of Australia after a two-year search and was brought to Los Angeles. Apparently it was the only surviving film version of the movie. The film had a rare showing in 2012 in  Los Angeles.

Soundtrack
The film had a soundtrack album (Warner Bros.-Seven Arts WS 1791) of the score composed by John Simon and Collin Walcott. Heard on the soundtrack: John Simon (piano), Collin Walcott (sitar, tamboura), Aunt Mary's Transcendental Slip and Lurch Band (rock band), Cyrus Faryar (voice), Buddy Bruno (voice), Ray Draper (tuba, voice), Electric Meatball (rock band), Henry Diltz (banjo, voice), Bad Kharma Dan and the Bicycle Brothers (motorcycle gang). Rick Danko, Levon Helm and Richard Manuel of The Band played on the soundtrack as well, but were uncredited due because they recorded for another record label.

Reception
Last Summer received positive reviews.  Roger Ebert gave the movie four stars, writing:From time to time you find yourself wondering if there will ever be a movie that understands life the way you've experienced it. There are good movies about other people's lives, but rarely a movie that recalls, if only for a scene or two, the sense and flavor of life the way you remember it.<p>Adolescence is a period that most people, I imagine, remember rather well. For the first time in your life important things were happening to you; you were growing up; what mattered to you made a difference...[On] top of the desire to be brave and honorable, there was also the compelling desire to be accepted, to be admitted to membership in that adolescent society defined only by those excluded from it...<p>Frank Perry's "Last Summer" is about exactly such years and days, about exactly that time in the life of four 15- or 16-year-old adolescents, and it is one of the finest, truest, most deeply felt movies in my experience.

See also
 List of American films of 1969

References

External links
 
 
 

1969 films
1960s coming-of-age drama films
1960s teen drama films
Allied Artists films
American coming-of-age drama films
American teen drama films
Films based on American novels
Films directed by Frank Perry
Films set in New York (state)
Films set on islands
Films shot in New York (state)
Juvenile sexuality in films
Films about rape
Albums produced by John Simon (record producer)
Teensploitation
1969 drama films
1960s English-language films
1960s American films